Ellsworth is a surname, originating in England prior to or around the 11th century A.D. in the Cambridgeshire area. The name comes from Elsworth, from the place-name (and family seat) which in turn was derived from the Old English name "Eli" and "worth", an Old English word for farm or homestead. The original spelling was Aylesworth. Many spelling variants are known to exist, including Ellesworth, Elsworth, Ellsworth, Elisworth, Ellisworth, Ellsworthy, Aylesworth, Aylsworth, etc. Ellsworth is by far the most common Americanized/"standard" spelling.

Migration from Europe
Records show a number of emigrants to the new world in the 17th century such as:

 Josiah Ellsworth, settled in New England, possibly the same as is mentioned as purchasing land in Connecticut in 1645,
 Sir John Ellsworth, arrived in Boston, Massachusetts, in 1629
 Jeremiah Ellsworth, arrived in Rowley, Massachusetts, in 1650
 Theophilus Ellsworth, arrived in New Amsterdam in 1652.

Notable people with the surname include:

Bobby Ellsworth (Bobby "Blitz" Ellsworth), vocalist for the thrash metal band Overkill
Brad Ellsworth, U.S. Representative from Indiana
Charles C. Ellsworth (1824–1899), U.S. Representative from Michigan
Dick Ellsworth,  Major League baseball pitcher
Edmund Ellsworth, (1819–1893) LDS pioneer, Captain of the First Handcart Company
Colonel Elmer E. Ellsworth, (1837-1861) friend of Abraham Lincoln often called the "first conspicuous casualty" of the American Civil War
Harris Ellsworth, U.S. Representative from Oregon (1943–1957), chairman of U.S. Civil Service Commission (1957–1959), University of Oregon School of Journalism Hall of Achievement.
 James Ellsworth, Lincoln Ellsworth's father, noted banker who helped finance Roald Amundsen's polar 1925 North Pole expedition, coal mine owner, and benefactor of the city of Hudson, Ohio and the Western Reserve Academy
James Ellsworth (wrestler), American wrestler
Jason Ellsworth, American politician
Jeri Ellsworth, computer chip designer
Lincoln Ellsworth, American polar explorer and benefactor of the American Museum of Natural History
Oliver Ellsworth (1745–1807), 3rd Chief Justice of the U.S. Supreme Court, Founding Father of the United States
Richard E. Ellsworth (c. 1911 – March 18, 1953), World War II pilot and USAF commander during the early part of the Cold War
Robert Fred Ellsworth (1926–2011), U.S. Representative from Kansas and U.S. Ambassador to NATO
Robert H. Ellsworth (1929–2014), American dealer of Asian art.
Stukely Ellsworth (1769–1837), New York politician
Theodore Richards Ellsworth (1918–1986), World War II POW and author 
William W. Ellsworth (1791–1868), American attorney and politician, governor of Connecticut

It has also become a first name (e.g. Ellsworth Kelly) and a place name in the United States such as Ellsworth Air Force Base, Ellsworth, South Dakota, Ellsworth, Maine, Ellsworth, Kansas, etc.

References 

Surnames
English toponymic surnames
English-language surnames
Surnames of English origin
Surnames of British Isles origin